Cladonia cariosa, the split-peg lichen or the split-peg soldiers cup lichen, is a species of fruticose, cup lichen in the family Cladoniaceae. It was first formally named by Erik Acharius in 1799 as Lichen cariosus and transferred to the genus Cladonia in 1827 by Kurt Polycarp Joachim Sprengel. It has a broad distribution, occurring in Europe, Asia, North America, and South America.

References

cariosa
Lichen species
Taxa named by Erik Acharius
Lichens described in 1799